Aleksandr Komin or Alexander Komin  may refer to the following notable people:
Aleksandr Komin (killer) (1953–1999), Russian slave-owner and serial killer
Aleksandr Komin (cyclist) (born 1995), Russian cyclist